The Aurignacian is an archaeological industry of the Upper Paleolithic 
associated with Early European modern humans (EEMH) lasting from 43,000 to 26,000 years ago. The Upper Paleolithic developed in Europe some time after the Levant, where the Emiran period and the Ahmarian period form the first periods of the Upper Paleolithic, corresponding to the first stages of the expansion of Homo sapiens out of Africa.  They then migrated to Europe and created the first European culture of modern humans, the Aurignacian.

An Early Aurignacian or Proto-Aurignacian stage is dated between about 43,000 and 37,000 years ago. The Aurignacian proper lasts from about 37,000 to 33,000 years ago. A Late Aurignacian phase transitional with the Gravettian dates to about 33,000 to 26,000 years ago.
The type site is the Cave of Aurignac, Haute-Garonne, south-west France. The main preceding period is the Mousterian of the Neanderthals.

One of the oldest examples of figurative art, the Venus of Hohle Fels, comes from the Aurignacian or Proto-Gravettian and is dated to between 40,000 and 35,000 years ago (though now earlier figurative art may be known, see Lubang Jeriji Saléh). It was discovered in September 2008 in a cave at Schelklingen in Baden-Württemberg in western Germany. The German Lion-man figure is given a similar date range.  The Bacho Kiro site in Bulgaria is one of the earliest known Aurignacian burials.

A "Levantine Aurignacian" culture is known from the Levant, with a type of blade technology very similar to the European Aurignacian, following chronologically the Emiran and Early Ahmarian in the same area of the Near East, and also closely related to them. The Levantine Aurignacian may have preceded European Aurignacian, but there is a possibility that the Levantine Aurignacian was rather the result of reverse influence from the European Aurignacian: this remains unsettled.

Main characteristics

The Aurignacians are part of the wave of anatomically modern humans thought to have spread from Africa through the Near East into Paleolithic Europe, and became known as European early modern humans, or Cro-Magnons. This wave of anatomically modern humans includes fossils of the Ahmarian, Bohunician, Aurignacian, Gravettian, Solutrean and Magdalenian cultures, extending throughout the Last Glacial Maximum (LGM), covering the period of roughly 48,000 to 15,000 years ago.

The Aurignacian tool industry is characterized by worked bone or antler points with grooves cut in the bottom. Their flint tools include fine blades and bladelets struck from prepared cores rather than using crude flakes. The people of this culture also produced some of the earliest known cave art, such as the animal engravings at Trois Freres and the paintings at Chauvet cave in southern France. They also made pendants, bracelets, and ivory beads, as well as three-dimensional figurines. Perforated rods, thought to be spear throwers or shaft wrenches, also are found at their sites.

Population
A 2019 demographic analysis estimated a mean population of 1,500 persons (upper limit: 3,300; lower limit: 800) for western and central Europe.

A 2005 study estimated the population of Upper Palaeolithic Europe from 40–30 thousand years ago was 1,738–28,359 (average 4,424).

Association with modern humans

The sophistication and self-awareness demonstrated in the work led archaeologists to consider the makers of Aurignacian artifacts the first modern humans in Europe. Human remains and Late Aurignacian artifacts found in juxtaposition support this inference. Although finds of human skeletal remains in direct association with Proto-Aurignacian technologies are scarce in Europe, the few available are also probably modern human. The best dated association between Aurignacian industries and human remains are those of at least five individuals from the Mladeč caves in the Czech Republic, dated by direct radiocarbon measurements of the skeletal remains to at least 31,000–32,000 years old.

At least three robust, but typically anatomically-modern individuals from the Peștera cu Oase cave in Romania, were dated directly from the bones to ca. 35,000–36,000 BP. Although not associated directly with archaeological material, these finds are within the chronological and geographical range of the Early Aurignacian in southeastern Europe. On genetic evidence it has been argued that both Aurignacian and the Dabba culture of North Africa came from an earlier big game hunting Levantine Aurignacian culture of the Levant.

Art

Aurignacian figurines have been found depicting faunal representations of the time period associated with now-extinct mammals, including mammoths, rhinoceros, and tarpan, along with anthropomorphized depictions that may be interpreted as some of the earliest evidence of religion.

Many 35,000-year-old animal figurines were discovered in the Vogelherd Cave in Germany. One of the horses, amongst six tiny mammoth and horse ivory figures found previously at Vogelherd, was sculpted as skillfully as any piece found throughout the Upper Paleolithic. The production of ivory beads for body ornamentation was also important during the Aurignacian. The famous paintings in Chauvet cave date from this period.

Typical statuettes consist of women that are called Venus figurines. They emphasize the hips, breasts, and other body parts associated with fertility. Feet and arms are lacking or minimized. One of the most ancient figurines is the Venus of Hohle Fels, discovered in 2008 in the Hohle Fels cave in Germany. The figurine has been dated to 35,000 years ago and is the earliest known, undisputed example of a depiction of a human being in prehistoric art. The Lion-man of Hohlenstein-Stadel, found in the Hohlenstein-Stadel cave of Germany's Swabian Alb and dated to 40,000 years ago, is the oldest known anthropomorphic animal figurine in the world.

Aurignacian finds include bone flutes. The oldest undisputed musical instrument was the Hohle Fels Flute discovered in the Hohle Fels cave in Germany's Swabian Alb in 2008. The flute is made from a vulture's wing bone perforated with five finger holes, and dates to approximately 35,000-40,000 years ago. A flute was also found at the Abri Blanchard in southwestern France.

Gallery

Tools

Stone tools from the Aurignacian culture are known as Mode 4, characterized by blades (rather than flakes, typical of mode 2 Acheulean and mode 3 Mousterian) from prepared cores. Also seen throughout the Upper Paleolithic is a greater degree of tool standardization and the use of bone and antler for tools. Based on the research of scraper reduction and paleoenvironment, the early Aurignacian group moved seasonally over greater distances to procure reindeer herds within cold and open environments than those of the earlier tool cultures.

Genetics
In a genetic study published in Nature in May 2016, the remains of an early Aurignacian individual from modern-day Belgium were examined. He belonged to the paternal haplogroup C1a and the maternal haplogroup M. Haplogroups identified in other Aurignacian samples are the paternal haplogroups IJ and K2a; and mt-DNA haplogroup N, R, and U.  Haplogroup I emerged about 35 to 30 thousand years ago, either in Europe or Western Asia. Haplogroup I appears to have arisen in Europe, so far being found in Palaeolithic sites throughout Europe. Mt-haplogroup U5 arose in Europe just prior to the LGM, between 35 and 25 thousand years ago.

Location

Asia
Lebanon/Palestine/Israel region

Contained within a stratigraphic column, along with other cultures.

Siberia

Many sites in Siberia including around Lake Baikal, the Ob River valley, and Minusinsk.

See also

Cave of Aurignac
Ksar Akil
Venus figurines
Bacho Kiro cave

Notes

References

Sources

External links

Picture Gallery of the Paleolithic (reconstructional palaeoethnology), Libor Balák at the Czech Academy of Sciences, the Institute of Archaeology in Brno, The Center for Paleolithic and Paleoethnological Research

 
Upper Paleolithic cultures of Europe
Peopling of Europe
Industries (archaeology)